Vasyl Pavlovych Frantsuz (born 12 January 1996) is a Ukrainian professional footballer who plays as a centre-back for Ukrainian club Prykarpattia Ivano-Frankivsk.

References

External links
 Profile on Prykarpattia Ivano-Frankivsk official website
 
 

1996 births
Living people
Sportspeople from Ivano-Frankivsk
Ukrainian footballers
Association football defenders
FC Karpaty Yaremche players
FC Prykarpattia Ivano-Frankivsk (1998) players
Ukrainian First League players
Ukrainian Second League players